Chantraine is a commune in the Vosges department in Grand Est in northeastern France.

Twin towns — sister cities
Chantraine is twinned with:

  Cantarana, Italy (2007)

See also
Communes of the Vosges department

References

External links

Official site

Communes of Vosges (department)